Mimarachnidae is an extinct family of planthoppers known from the Cretaceous period. Their name is derived from spots on the wings of the first described genera, Mimarachne and Saltissus, being suggestive of spider mimicry, but these characters are not distinctive for the family as a whole. The family is characterised by "simplified venation and setigerous metatibial pecten and hind leg armature". as well as "rounded anterior margin of pronotum, double carination of pronotum and mesonotum"

Genera 

 †Ayaimatum Jiang & Szwedo in Jiang et al., 2020 Burmese amber, Myanmar, Cenomanian
 †Ayaimatum trilobatum Jiang & Szwedo in Jiang et al., 2020
†Ayaimatum minutum Fu & Huang, 2021
 †Burmissus Shcherbakov, 2017 Burmese amber, Myanmar, Cenomanian
 †Burmissus raunoi Shcherbakov, 2017
 †Burmissus szwedoi Luo et al., 2020
 †Burmissus latimaculatus Fu & Huang, 2020
 †Chalicoridulum Szwedo & Ansorge, 2015 La Pedrera de Rúbies Formation, Spain, Barremian
 †Chalicoridulum montsecensis Szwedo & Ansorge, 2015
 †Cretodorus Fu & Huang, 2020 Burmese amber, Myanmar, Cenomanian
 †Cretodorus granulatus Fu & Huang, 2020
 †Cretodorus angustus Fu & Huang, 2020
†Cretodorus rostellatus Zhang et al., 2021
 †Dachibangus Jiang et al., 2018 Burmese amber, Myanmar, Cenomanian
 †Dachibangus formosus Fu et al., 2019
†Dachibangus hui Zhang, Yao & Pang, 2021
 †Dachibangus trimaculatus Jiang et al., 2018
 †Jaculistilus Zhang et al., 2018 Burmese amber, Myanmar, Cenomanian
 †Jaculistilus oligotrichus Zhang et al., 2018
 †Mimamontsecia Szwedo & Ansorge, 2015 La Pedrera de Rúbies Formation, Spain, Barremian
 †Mimamontsecia cretacea Szwedo & Ansorge, 2015
 †Mimaplax Jiang et al., 2019 Burmese amber, Myanmar, Cenomanian
 †Mimaplax ekrypsan Jiang et al., 2019
†Mimaeurypterus Fu & Huang, 2021 Burmese amber, Myanmar, Cenomanian
†Mimaeurypterus burmiticus Fu & Huang, 2021
 †Mimarachne Shcherbakov, 2007 Zaza Formation, Russia, Aptian
 †Mimarachne mikhailovi Shcherbakov, 2007

 †Multistria Zhang, Yao & Pang, 2021 Burmese amber, Myanmar, Cenomanian
 †Multistria orthotropa Zhang, Yao & Pang, 2021

 †Nipponoridium Szwedo, 2008 Kuwajima Formation, Japan, Lower Cretaceous
 †Nipponoridium matsuoi Fujiyama, 1978 (Formerly Fulgoridium)
 †Saltissus Shcherbakov, 2007 
 †Saltissus eskovi Shcherbakov, 2007 Zaza Formation, Russia, Aptian
†Saltissus fennahi Luo, Liu & Jarzembowski, 2021 Weald Clay, England, Barremian
Undescribed specimens are known from the Early Cretaceous Turga and Khetana localities of Russia, the Barremian-Aptian Khurilt locality of Mongolia, and the Turonian Kzyl-Zhar locality of Kazakhstan.

References

Fulgoromorpha
Prehistoric insect families